Diffpack is a programming environment for developing simulation software for scientific and engineering applications. Diffpack has its main focus on the numerical modeling and solution of partial differential equations, in particular by the finite element method and the finite difference method (finite volume method is also supported to some extent).

Features 
The Diffpack software consists of a family of C++ libraries for general tasks related to numerical solution of partial differential equations, plus a set of Perl and Python scripts that ease the development of simulation programs and problem solving environments for scientific or engineering research. The package was one of the first to explore object-oriented programming and the C++ language for advanced, high-performance computing.

History 
Diffpack has been actively developed since 1991, with main contributions from University of Oslo and the research institutes SINTEF and Simula Research Laboratory. The initiators and main contributors to Diffpack in the 1990s were Hans Petter Langtangen and Are Magnus Bruaset. Version 1.0 of the software was released in the public domain in 1995, with a new version in 1997. 

The Norwegian company Numerical Objects AS took over the rights of Diffpack 1997 and commercialized the product. In 2003, the German company inuTech GmbH purchased Diffpack and is now the principal maintainer and developer of the software.

Adoption 
Past and present Diffpack customers include AREVA NP, Air Force Research Laboratory, Robert Bosch GmbH, Cambridge University, Canon, CEA, CalCom, DaimlerChrysler, Furukawa, Harvard University, Intel, Mitsubishi, NASA, Nestle, Nippon Steel, Shell, Siemens, Stanford University, Statoil, Veritas, VAI GmbH, and Xerox. Diffpack applications have been built in diverse areas, such as oil and gas, mechanical engineering, telecommunication, medicine and finance. The customer activities span from simple prototype applications to projects involving several man-years of simulator development.

See also 
 List of finite element software packages
 List of numerical analysis software

References 
 Diffpack website
 Computational Partial Differential Equations - Numerical Methods and Diffpack Programming (book)
 inuTech GmbH

Scientific simulation software
Finite element software
Finite element software for Linux